Guo Shasha (born April 22, 1976) is a retired Chinese rhythmic gymnast.

She competed for China in the rhythmic gymnastics all-around competition at the 1992 Summer Olympics in Barcelona. She was 36th in the qualification round and didn't advance to the final.

References

External links 
 

1976 births
Living people
Chinese rhythmic gymnasts
Gymnasts at the 1992 Summer Olympics
Olympic gymnasts of China